Song of the Silent Land (2004) is the second various-artists compilation album from Constellation Records, and their first to feature unreleased and hard-to-find tracks from the label roster: 13 of the 14 tracks were previously unreleased.

Track listing
"The Sky Lay Still" – Elizabeth Anka Vajagic (6:22)
"Winter Hymn Winter Hymn Winter Hymn" – Do Make Say Think (4:54)
"Wool Fever Dub" – Exhaust (3:05)
"(Re)View from the Ground" – Hangedup (4:30)
"Toyte Goyes in Shineln" – Black Ox Orkestar (3:44)
"This Machine" – Sackville (4:57)
"Iron Bridge to Thunder Bay" – Silver Mt. Zion (8:12)
"String of Lights" – Sofa (5:33)
"Dreaming (...Again)" – Polmo Polpo (4:50)
"Slippage" – Re: (3:25)
"Tres Tres 'Avant' " – Fly Pan Am (5:10)
"Fair Warning" – 1-Speed Bike (5:03)
"See My Film" – Frankie Sparo (3:57)
"Outro [Live in Nantes]" – Godspeed You! Black Emperor (7:33)

External links
 Song of the Silent Land at Constellation Records

2004 compilation albums
Post-rock albums by Canadian artists
Compilation albums by Canadian artists
Experimental music compilation albums
Constellation Records (Canada) compilation albums